Peter Collins is an Irish sportscaster for national broadcaster Raidió Teilifís Éireann (RTÉ). He is seen on RTÉ's coverage of live Soccer, Gaelic games, Formula One, track & field athletics and Moto GP. He is the current presenter of Soccer Republic and SSE Airtricity League 'live'.

Collins is a native of Westport, County Mayo.

Peter Collins played football for Westport United FC and won a Connaught Cup medal with the club back in 1987.

He is a father.

Career
Prior to focusing solely on sports broadcasting, Collins was a late-night radio DJ on 2FM, and also occasionally presented the RTÉ TV / radio simulcast The Beatbox.

Collins has presented and/or commentated for RTÉ at all major championships (Olympic Games, FIFA World CUP, UEFA European Championship) since 1990.

References

External links
 Peter Collins to present Irish Sports Person of the Year Award live on RTÉ
 Peter Collins presents prizes at Slievenamon Golf Club Classic

1964 births
Living people
Gaelic games commentators
Irish association football commentators
Motorsport announcers
People from Westport, County Mayo
RTÉ television presenters
20th-century Irish people
21st-century Irish people